Denis Aleksandrovich Ulanov (born 28 October 1993) is a Kazakh Olympic weightlifter. He represented his country at the 2016 Summer Olympics, where he won the bronze medal.

Career
In the Men's 85 kg Weightlifting competition at the 2016 Summer Olympics in Rio de Janeiro, Brazil winning the bronze medal. He initially finished fourth behind Gabriel Sîncrăian of Romania, who was later on October 13, 2016, the IWF reported that bronze medalist Gabriel Sîncrăian  had tested positive for excess testosterone in a test connected to the Rio Olympics.

Denis participated in the men's 85 kg class at 2016 Asian Weightlifting Championships in Tashkent, Uzbekistan. He won gold - snatched 168 kg and jerked an additional 205 kg for a total of 373 kg. 

Ulanov won a gold medal at the 2017 Summer Universiade in Taipei, snatching 165 kg and clean and jerking 200 kg, setting 365 kg for a total.

Major results

Doping sanction
In September of 2013 Ulanov won the Asian Junior Cup in Pyongyang, after the competition he had produce positive doping test. He used Stanozolol and he was banned between 17.10.2013 - 17.10.2015.

References 

1993 births
Living people
Kazakhstani male weightlifters
Weightlifters at the 2016 Summer Olympics
Olympic weightlifters of Kazakhstan
Universiade medalists in weightlifting
Universiade gold medalists for Kazakhstan
Olympic bronze medalists for Kazakhstan
Medalists at the 2017 Summer Universiade
21st-century Kazakhstani people